Dewdney is an old English name, going back to pre 1500.

List of people with the surname 

 Alexander Dewdney (born 1941), Canadian mathematician, computer scientist and philosopher
 Anna Dewdney (1965–2016), American author and illustrator of children's books
 Christopher Dewdney (born 1951), Canadian poet
 Edgar Dewdney (1835–1916), Canadian surveyor, engineer, politician, and provincial Lieutenant-Governor
 Selwyn Dewdney (1909–1979), Canadian author, illustrator and artist, father of Alexander and Christopher
 Tom Dewdney (born 1933), West Indian cricketer

Surnames
English-language surnames
Surnames of English origin
Surnames of British Isles origin